The Bezirksliga Rhein-Saar was the highest association football league in the German state of Saarland, the Bavarian region of Palatinate and the northernmost part of Baden from 1927 to 1933. The league was disbanded with the rise of the Nazis to power in 1933.

Overview
The league was formed in 1927, from the clubs of the Bezirksliga Rhein and the southern half of the Bezirksliga Rheinhessen-Saar. The clubs from the Bezirksliga Rheinhessen-Saar which did not become part of the new league were added to the new Bezirksliga Main-Hessen instead. While the majority of clubs originated from the Palatinate and the Saarland it also incooperated some clubs from the state of Baden, from the Mannheim area and from the Prussian Rhine Province, from Trier.

The league operated from the start in two regional divisions, the Rhein-division, named after the river Rhein and the Saar-division, named after the river of Saar. The first played with eleven, the second with ten clubs in its first season 1927-28. The clubs in each division played each other in a home-and-away round with the division winners advancing to the Southern German championship, which in turn was a qualification tournament for the German championship. A Bezirksliga final was not played.

The second and third placed team in each division qualified for another round, the Bezirksliga runners-up round, to determine one more team which would gain entry to the German finals.

The leagues were reduced to nine teams each in the following season but remained unchanged in modus otherwise. For the 1929-30 season, both divisions then operated on a strength of eight teams, a system that also applied in the following season.

In the 1931-32 season, both divisions expanded in strength to ten teams. The Southern German finals were also reorganised with the top two teams from each division advancing to the Northwest finals group.

In its last season, 1932–33, both divisions operated on a strength of ten clubs.

With the rise of the Nazis to power, the Gauligas were introduced as the highest football leagues in Germany. In the region, the Gauliga Südwest/Mainhessen replaced the Bezirksliga Rhein-Saar as the highest level of play. The clubs from Mannheim however entered the new Gauliga Baden while the teams from Trier went to the Gauliga Mittelrhein.

National success

Southern German championship
Qualified teams and their success:

 1928:
 Borussia Neunkirchen, 8th place in the Bezirksliga-runners-up round
 Saar 05 Saarbrücken, 7th place in the Bezirksliga-runners-up round
 Ludwigshafener FG, 4th place in the Bezirksliga-runners-up round
 VfL Neckarau, 3rd place in theBezirksliga-runners-up round
 FV Saarbrücken, 8th place
 Waldhof Mannheim, 7th place
 1929:
 1. FC Idar, 7th place in the Bezirksliga-runners-up round
 Saar 05 Saarbrücken, 6th place in the Bezirksliga-runners-up round
 VfR Mannheim, 3rd place in the Bezirksliga-runners-up round
 Waldhof Mannheim, 2nd place in the Bezirksliga-runners-up round
 Borussia Neunkirchen, 8th place
 VfL Neckarau, 3rd place
 1930:
 FV Saarbrücken, 8th place in the Bezirksliga-runners-up round
 VfL Neckarau, 7th place in the Bezirksliga-runners-up round
 Sportfreunde Saarbrücken, 4th place in the Bezirksliga-runners-up round
 Phönix Ludwigshafen, 2nd place in the Bezirksliga-runners-up round
 Waldhof Mannheim, 6th place
 FK Pirmasens, 4th place
 1931:
 1. FC Idar, 7th place in the Bezirksliga-runners-up round
 VfL Neckarau, 6th place in the Bezirksliga-runners-up round
 FV Saarbrücken, 4th place in the Bezirksliga-runners-up round
 Phönix Ludwigshafen, Winner of the Bezirksliga-runners-up round, loser division final
 FK Pirmasens, 6th place
 Waldhof Mannheim, 4th place
 1932:
 Waldhof Mannheim, 7th place northwest division
 FK Pirmasens, 6th place northwest division
 FV Saarbrücken, 5th place northwest division
 VfL Neckarau, 4th place northwest division
 1933:
 1. FC Kaiserslautern, 8th place eastwest division
 FK Pirmasens, 7th place eastwest division
 Phönix Ludwigshafen, 6th place eastwest division
 Waldhof Mannheim, 5th place eastwest division

German championship
Qualified teams and their success:

 1928:
 none qualified
 1929:
 none qualified
 1930:
 none qualified
 1931:
 none qualified
 1932:
 none qualified
 1933:
 none qualified

Founding members of the league
The 21 founding members of the league and their positions in the 1926-27 season were:

Saar division
 FV Saarbrücken, Runners-up Bezirksliga Rheinhessen/Saar
 Borussia Neunkirchen, 7th Bezirksliga Rheinhessen/Saar
 SV Saar 05 Saarbrücken, 9th Bezirksliga Rheinhessen/Saar
 1. FC Idar, 6th Bezirksliga Rheinhessen/Saar
 FK Pirmasens, 5th Bezirksliga Rhein
 Sportfreunde Saarbrücken
 VfR Pirmasens
 FC Kreuznach
 SV Trier
 Eintracht Trier, 10th Bezirksliga Rheinhessen/Saar

Rhein division
 Waldhof Mannheim, 4th Bezirksliga Rhein
 VfL Neckarau, Winner Bezirksliga Rhein
 VfR Mannheim, Runners-up Bezirksliga Rhein
 Ludwigshafener FG, 7th Bezirksliga Rhein
 Phönix Ludwigshafen, 3rd Bezirksliga Rhein
 MFC Lindenhof
 SpVgg Sandhofen, 9th Bezirksliga Rhein
 Pfalz Ludwigshafen
 FV Speyer, 8th Bezirksliga Rhein
 Phönix Mannheim, 10th Bezirksliga Rhein
 Germania Friedrichsfeld
 All teams without a 1926-27 placing were promoted from the second tier this season.

Winners and runners-up of the Bezirksliga Rhein-Saar

Placings in the Bezirksliga Rhein-Saar 1927-33

Rhein division

Source:

Saar division

Source:

References

Sources
 Fussball-Jahrbuch Deutschland  (8 vol.), Tables and results of the German tier-one leagues 1919-33, publisher: DSFS
 Kicker Almanach,  The yearbook on German football from Bundesliga to Oberliga, since 1937, published by the Kicker Sports Magazine
 Süddeutschlands Fussballgeschichte in Tabellenform 1897-1988  History of Southern German football in tables, publisher & author: Ludolf Hyll

External links
 The Gauligas  Das Deutsche Fussball Archiv
 German league tables 1892-1933  Hirschi's Fussball seiten
 Germany - Championships 1902-1945 at RSSSF.com

1
1927 establishments in Germany
1933 disestablishments in Germany
Football competitions in Saarland
Football competitions in Rhineland-Palatinate
Southern German football championship